Xenophanes of Colophon (6th century BC) was a Greek philosopher.

Xenophanes may also refer to:

Xenophanes (album), an album by Omar Rodríguez-López
Xenophanes (butterfly), a genus of skipper butterfly
Xenophanes (crater), a lunar crater
6026 Xenophanes, a main-belt asteroid